Mohamed Lamine Zemmamouche (born 19 March 1985) is an Algerian footballer who plays for USM Alger in the Algerian Ligue Professionnelle 1 and the Algeria national team.

Club career

USM Alger

MC Alger

USM Alger back again
On 10 July Zemmamouche returned to USM Alger again, although some supporters refused to return because of the famous penalty kick against the USM Alger in 2010 at the Algerian Cup. the goalkeeper said after the penalty kick recorded was not a provocation to supporters and apologized to them, However, he spent a three-year contract worth 3,500,000 DZD by a month to become the highest salary holder in the Ligue 1, in his first season after returning. Zemmamouche participated in 32 matches between the Ligue 1 and the cup, contributing to the return of the team to continental tournaments after six years of absence.

In the following season 2012–13 is the beginning of a new era with the titles where the goalkeeper contributed to the coronation Algerian Cup and the Arab Club Cup, where he did not receive goals in 22 games, including 14 in the Ligue 1 is the best outcome of his career, also Zemmamouche repelled two kick penalties against the Egyptian club Ismaily SC was the spa in the arrival to the final. the same thing in the final cup against his former club MC Alger where he played a big game. by the end of the season, Zemmamouche won the best goalkeeper award in the Ligue 1, presented by Maracana Foot. The next season was good for the international goalkeeper, where he managed to lead the team to the league title after a 9-year absence and also to win the Super Cup for the first time and after the great level in the last two seasons, was able to secure a ticket to participate in the FIFA World Cup to become the first player in the history of the USM Alger, as for this season participated in 27 games, including 15 clean sheets.

International career
In December 2009, Zemmamouche was selected by Algeria national team coach Rabah Saâdane to play in the 2010 African Cup of Nations hosted in Angola, and as backup to Faouzi Chaouchi, he came on as a replacement in the semi-final against Egypt following Chaouchi's sending-off, before playing the entire 90 minutes of the third-place playoff against Nigeria.

Zemmamouche was the last player cut as coach Saâdane finalised his 23-man squad for the 2010 FIFA World Cup South Africa.

Zemmamouche was also selected in the Algerian national team for the 2014 FIFA World Cup in Brazil as Algeria's second-choice goalkeeper. He contested one qualifier ahead of the 2014 FIFA World Cup, filling in for Raïs M'Bolhi against Burkina Faso.

Career statistics

Club

Honours
USM Alger
 Algerian Ligue Professionnelle 1: 2004–05, 2013–14, 2015–16, 2018–19
 Algerian Cup: 2004, 2013
 Algerian Super Cup: 2013, 2016
 UAFA Club Cup: 2013

MC Alger
 Algerian Ligue Professionnelle 1: 2009–10

References

External links

 
 Player's profile, FIFA.com
 Player's profile, USM Alger
 

1985 births
Living people
Algerian footballers
2010 Africa Cup of Nations players
2014 FIFA World Cup players
USM Alger players
People from Mila
Algerian Ligue Professionnelle 1 players
Algeria A' international footballers
Algeria under-23 international footballers
2011 African Nations Championship players
Algeria youth international footballers
MC Alger players
2015 Africa Cup of Nations players
Association football goalkeepers
Algeria international footballers
21st-century Algerian people